The Conference on Semantics in Healthcare and Life Sciences (CSHALS) was a scientific meeting on the practical applications of semantic technology to pharmaceutical R&D, healthcare, and life sciences. The conference was held annually from 2008 to 2014, and was the premier meeting in this domain. In 2015, it was organised as a special interests group (SIG) meeting of the Intelligent Systems for Molecular Biology conference.

Conference topics included a World Wide Web Consortium tutorial on semantic web standards. In 2012, CSHALS took on the additional topic of the application of Big Data to healthcare and life sciences, while maintaining its previous focus on semantic technologies.

Organization 
CSHALS was organized by ISCB (International Society for Computational Biology).

List of conferences
 CSHALS 2008 was held in Cambridge, Massachusetts, United States
 CSHALS 2009 was held in Cambridge, Massachusetts, United States
 CSHALS 2010 was held in Cambridge, Massachusetts, United States
 CSHALS 2011 was held in Cambridge, Massachusetts, United States
 CSHALS 2012 was held in Cambridge, Massachusetts, United States
 CSHALS 2013 was held in Cambridge, Massachusetts, United States
 CSHALS 2014 was held in Boston, Massachusetts, United States
 CSHALS 2015 was held in Dublin, Ireland

References

External links 
 CSHALS 2015 Site

Biology conferences
Bioinformatics
Computational science
Knowledge engineering
Knowledge management
Semantic Web